The 2010–11 season was FC Brașov's third season in Liga I since their return to top-flight football in 2008.

Overview
On June 16 the players returned from holiday to training. Only 9 from the 27 players squad in the previous season were present and few others from the reserve/junior teams, after many of the key players had left the club, having finished their contracts with Braşov. Few days later 2 other players joined the training, Cristian Ionescu and Mihai Roman, the first extending his contract for another year. Later on Mincă also returned to training. Previous season' main coach Viorel Moldovan finished his contract with Braşov, while Robert Ilyes was named player/assistant manager, alongside Daniel Isăilă, the other assistant manager. The executive director Dinu Gheorghe left Braşov for Rapid București.

The club reached this season for the second consecutive time into the semifinals of the Romanian Cup. They missed by little the chance to play the final on their home ground, being eliminated on away goals by Steaua București after an 86-minute equaliser by Nicolae Dică, in the second leg match.

Manager
Although it was almost certain that the Bosnian Blaž Slišković would be the new manager, on June 27 it was announced that the Italian Giuseppe Materazzi would take onto the team in the next season, with the goal of qualifying for the Europa League. He was sacked only three days later without any official reason. In the evening of July 8 the club announced that Rapid assistant manager Marian Rada would take charge at Braşov. That started unrest among the fans, publicly stated on the Internet, causing him to give up on taking the job. Next day the club finally announced that players' and fans' favorite Daniel Isăilă would be the main coach. Isăilă had been the assistant manager of Braşov in the last two seasons, under Răzvan Lucescu and Viorel Moldovan, and a former Braşov player from the UEFA Cup period of 2001. He has been at the club all years since then, as a player or assistant manager, except for one half of a season in 2007 when he managed local neighbor club FC Săcele, spectacularly succeeding to avoid relegation and even achieving a 3–2 victory against Braşov in a season ending match.

On December 18, unexpectedly, António Conceição was presented as the new manager of the team, while Daniel Isăilă remained however in the technical staff as the assistant manager. The Portuguese manager had been in the previous season the manager of CFR Cluj for an eight-month period, achieving to win the Liga I and the Romanian Cup. The deal was signed for the remaining half of the season, with an extension clause included. Iosif Kovacs was also returning to the club after six years to take the chairman job.

Players
The squad was filled with several players from the reserves team or from the under 21 team who had been loaned to regional lower division clubs the previous season. That included: Alexandru Târziu (previous season at Unirea Tărlungeni), Alexandru David (previous season at Snagov), Ciprian Pricop (previous season Arieşul Turda) and the junior players Florin Iacob, Vlad Potecu, Darius Drăgan, Manuel Creţulescu, Bogdan Liţă.

On June 27 it has been announced that other two key players of the previous season, Mihai Roman and Sabrin Sburlea had been transferred to Rapid București for an unofficial fee of €800,000 or €1.5 million by other sources.

On 2 July two foreign players signed with Braşov: the Brazilian aged 26, José Willams da Silva Mendonça (referred to as Willams), who had played the previous season for Portuguese Second League side Trofense, and the Slovak aged 31, Peter Majerník, last time at Slovak Superliga team MFK Ružomberok. Both of them came as free agents. A total of eight players were registered at the PFL ahead of the first game of the season. The only player to join the squad few days before the first league game was Cosmin Năstăsie, who came on a one-year loan from Argeş Piteşti.

Dănuţ Coman, once the goalkeeper of the Romania national football team, and the club mutually agreed to end their contract on August 7, so that he was released on free transfer. Only eleven days later he returned at Rapid București, his previous team before playing for Braşov. At this time he had been injured since early April and was lacking training, so that he was not the first choice for goalkeeper at Rapid after being signed. Still it has been stated that his salary was far too high for the club's budget. He was the sixteenth player to leave the club this season.

Nuno Viveiros was signed by Braşov on August 25, after he ended his contract with Politehnica Iaşi by mutual agreement. His former club was relegated from Liga I the last season, but was neither able to meet conditions for playing in Liga II in the 2010–11 season.

Transfers continued at Braşov during the season break in the start of September, consisting in two other signings: Daniel Bălaşa (previously at Argeş Piteşti), and the Ivorian striker Lamine Diarrassouba (previously at Politehnica Iaşi).

The middle of the season saw somehow important changes in the squad, the new manager bringing four fresh new South American players: Diego Gaúcho, David Distéfano, Josías Paulo Cardoso and Juan Toloza. At the same time, the first option for the goalkeeper position until the winter break, Mihai Mincă was leaving to CFR Cluj, and three other players, Daniel Bălaşa, Laurenţiu Dumitru and Valentin Bădoi were terminating their contracts. Also during January, strikers Lamine Diarrassouba and Valentin Badea ended their contracts with the club by mutual agreement. With 9 foreign players, this season's squad was most probably the one with the most in club's history.

The last transfer of the mid-season completed under the new coach was French-born Portuguese Filipe Teixeira, landed on loan until the end of the season from Ukrainian side Metalurh Donetsk on February 21, 2011. Also junior player Darius Drăgan was being loaned out to fellow local club SCM Braşov.

It was announced near the end of the season, on May 14, that Braşov had reached an agreement with Chilean club Unión San Felipe for the transfer of Argentine midfielder Miguel Ángel González, known as El Mágico. Also the loans of the other two players from the Chilean club, Juan Toloza and David Distéfano, were extended for one more season. Wearing the number 10 in San Felipe's squad, the Argentine is supposed to be the replacement of 37 years old captain player Robert Ilyes, after rumors regarding his eventual departure to the Liga I club Târgu Mureş were finally confirmed on May 15.

Cristian Oroş settled a transfer to Rapid București for the next season, while coach António Conceição stated he would continue at Braşov only if the club aimed at being one of the strongest in the country. The objective set for the next season would be a top five finish.

Squad

(captain)

Transfers

Pre-season

In:

Out:

Mid-season

In:

Out:

Friendlies

Pre-season

H = Home, A = Away, N = Neutral

Mid-season

H = Home, A = Away, N = Neutral

Competitions

Liga I

H = Home, A = Away, N = Neutral

Cupa României

H = Home, A = Away, N = Neutral

References

Brasov